Lamyctes is a genus of centipedes in the family Henicopidae. It was described by Danish entomologist Frederik Vilhelm August Meinert in 1868.

Species
There are over 40 valid species:

 Lamyctes adisi Zalesskaja, 1994
 Lamyctes africanus (Porat, 1871)
 Lamyctes albipes (Pocock, 1895)
 Lamyctes anderis Chamberlin, 1955
 Lamyctes andinus Kraus, 1954
 Lamyctes baeckstroemi Verhoeff, 1924
 Lamyctes caducens Chamberlin, 1938
 Lamyctes cairensis Chamberlin, 1921
 Lamyctes calbucensis Verhoeff, 1939
 Lamyctes castaneus Attems, 1909
 Lamyctes cerronus Chamberlin, 1957
 Lamyctes coeculus (Brölemann, 1889)
 Lamyctes cuzcotes Chamberlin, 1944
 Lamyctes diffusus Chamberlin & Mulaik, 1940
 Lamyctes emarginatus (Newport, 1844)
 Lamyctes gracilipes Takakuwa, 1940
 Lamyctes guamus Chamberlin, 1946
 Lamyctes hellyeri Edgecombe & Giribet, 2003
 Lamyctes inermipes (Silvestri, 1897)
 Lamyctes inexpectatus Kurochkina, 2007
 Lamyctes insulanus Verhoeff, 1941
 Lamyctes leleupi Matic & Darabantu, 1977
 Lamyctes leon Chamberlin, 1944
 Lamyctes liani Larwood, 1946
 Lamyctes medius Chamberlin, 1951
 Lamyctes microporus Attems, 1909
 Lamyctes neglectus Lawrence, 1955
 Lamyctes neotropicus Turk, 1955
 Lamyctes nesiotes Chamberlin, 1952
 Lamyctes omissus Kraus, 1957
 Lamyctes orthodox Chamberlin, 1951
 Lamyctes oticus Archey, 1921
 Lamyctes pachypes Takakuwa, 1941
 Lamyctes pinampus Chamberlin, 1910
 Lamyctes pius Chamberlin, 1911
 Lamyctes remotior Chamberlin, 1955
 Lamyctes robustus Lawrence, 1955
 Lamyctes taulisensis Kraus, 1954
 Lamyctes tivius Chamberlin, 1911
 Lamyctes tolucanus Chamberlin, 1943
 Lamyctes transversus Chamberlin, 1962
 Lamyctes tristani (Pocock, 1893)

References

 

 
 
Centipede genera
Animals described in 1868
Taxa named by Frederik Vilhelm August Meinert